Johann Christian Polycarp Erxleben  was a German naturalist from Quedlinburg.

Erxleben was professor of physics and veterinary medicine at the University of Göttingen. He wrote Anfangsgründe der Naturlehre (1772) and Systema regni animalis (1777). He was founder of the first and oldest academic veterinary school in Germany, the Institute of Veterinary Medicine, in 1771.

He was the son of Dorothea Christiane Erxleben, the first woman in Germany to earn a medical degree.

Works 
 1767 Einige Anmerkungen über das Insektensystem des Hr. Geoffroy und die Schäfferschen Verbesserungen desselben. Hannoverisches Magazin, Hannover (Stück 20). 305–316.
 1772 Anfangsgründe der Naturlehre. Göttingen und Gotha, Dieterich 648 p., 8 Taf.
 1775 Anfangsgründe der Chemie . Göttingen, Dieterich, 472p. Digital edition by the University and State Library Düsseldorf
 1769–1778 Pallas, P. S.,  Baldinger, E. G., Erxleben, J. C. P.  [full title] Peter Simon Pallas Naturgeschichte merkwuerdiger Thiere, in welcher vornehmlich neue und unbekannte Thierarten durch Kupferstiche, Beschreibungen und Erklaerungen erlaeutert werden. Durch den Verfasser verteutscht. I. Band 1 bis 10te Sammlung mit Kupfern. Berlin und Stralsund, G. A. Lange (Samml. 1–10), 48 Taf.

References 

 Gerta Beaucamp: Johann Christian Polycarp Erxleben. Versuch einer Biographie und Bibliographie. (= Lichtenberg-Studien, hg. von Stefan Brüdermann und Ulrich Joost, Bd. 9). Wallstein Verlag Göttingen 1994
 Georg Christoph Lichtenberg: Vorlesungen zur Naturlehre. Ediert nach G. Chr. Lichtenbergs annotierten Handexemplar der 4. Auflage von Johann Christian Polykarp Erxlebens "Anfangsgründe der Naturlehre", hrsg. v. d. Akademie der Wissenschaften zu Göttingen. Wallstein Verlag Göttingen 2005
 Bertram Brenig: "Johann Christian Polycarp Erxleben (1744–1777) – Universalgelehrter, Naturforscher und Tierarzt". Georgia-Augusta 72, 35–44 (2000)

External links 
 
  Gaedike, R.; Groll, E. K. & Taeger, A. 2012: Bibliography of the entomological literature from the beginning until 1863 : online database – version 1.0 – Senckenberg Deutsches Entomologisches Institut.

German veterinarians
German naturalists
German entomologists
People from Quedlinburg
University of Göttingen alumni
Academic staff of the University of Göttingen
1744 births
1777 deaths